Wolfgang Börnsen (born 26 April 1942) is a German politician and member of the CDU, which he joined in 1967. He was born in Flensburg and was a member of the Bundestag from 1987 to 2013.

Bibliography
 Vorbild mit kleinen Fehlern – Abgeordnete zwischen Anspruch und Wirklichkeit. Siegler, Sankt Augustin, 2001, 
 Plattdeutsch im Deutschen Bundestag. Siegler, Sankt Augustin, 2001, 
 Fels oder Brandung? Gerhard Stoltenberg – der verkannte Visionär. Siegler, Sankt Augustin, 2004, 
 Rettet Berlin – Schleswig-Holsteins Beitrag zur Luftbrücke 1948/49. Wachholtz, Neumünster, 2008,

External links
 Biography at the German Bundestag

1942 births
Living people
People from Flensburg
German Protestants
People from the Province of Schleswig-Holstein
Members of the Bundestag for Schleswig-Holstein
Members of the Bundestag 2009–2013
Members of the Bundestag 2005–2009
Members of the Bundestag 2002–2005
Members of the Bundestag 1998–2002
Members of the Bundestag 1994–1998
Members of the Bundestag 1990–1994
Members of the Bundestag 1987–1990
Members of the Bundestag for the Christian Democratic Union of Germany